Quarterback is a one- or two-player American football arcade game released by Leland in 1987.

On Offensive, the player chooses a strategy by selecting a play and maneuvering their quarterback through the right hole or leading the intended receiver with the passing target to complete a pass. 
On Defense, the objective is to outwit the opponent by choosing an alignment that will stop the offense while positioning the player's linebacker to fill the gap, sack the quarterback, or complete a pass.
When kicking or punting, the wind is always a factor and the game clock comes into play near the end of each half.

The game keeps track of over 15 categories of game play statistics. Each player's salary reflects their overall performance in these areas. Players compete for the top salary.

Series 
1. Quarterback (1987) 
2. John Elway's Team Quarterback (1988)
3. All American Football (1989)

1987 video games
American football video games
Arcade video games
Arcade-only video games
Video games developed in the United States

References